Laygazan (also Romanized as Lāygazān) is a village in Tarom Rural District, in the Central District of Hajjiabad County, Hormozgan Province, Iran. At the 2006 census, the population was 21 and consisted of 9 families.

References 

Populated places in Hajjiabad County